The Illustrious Brotherhood of Our Blessed Lady (Illustre Lieve Vrouwe Broederschap) was a religious confraternity founded in 1318 in 's-Hertogenbosch to promote the veneration of the Mother of God. The brotherhood was organized around a carved wooden image of the Virgin Mary in St John’s Cathedral in 's-Hertogenbosch. The Brotherhood had two types of members: ordinary members and sworn members, also called 'swan-brethren' because they used to donate a swan for the yearly banquet. Sworn members were clerics in principle; in fact they were often chosen among the nobility, the magistrates, etc. As a result, the Brotherhood also functioned as an important social network.

Well-known members 
 Hieronymus Bosch (c. 1450 – 1516), painter.
 Nycasius de Clibano (? – 1497), singer and composer 
 Jheronimus de Clibano (c. 1459 – 1503), singer and composer 
 Jan Heyns (? – 1516), architect
 Frans Crabbe van Espleghem (c. 1480 – 1553), Flemish artist 
 Jan van Wintelroy (? – 1576), composer and choirmaster
 Matthaeus Pipelare (c. 1450 – c. 1515), composer and choirmaster
 Frederik van Egmond (c. 1470 – 1539), Count of Buren and lord of IJsselstein
 William the Silent (1533 – 1584), leader of the Dutch Revolt

References

Further reading
 Correspondence of Descartes: 1643; Appendix 2, pp. 193–94.

Confraternities
1318 establishments in Europe
Religious organizations established in the 1310s